The Leitrim Senior Hurling Club Championship is an annual hurling competition contested by top-tier Leitrim GAA clubs.

Carrick Hurling are the title holders (2022) defeating Cluainín Iomáint in the Final.

History
Records are unclear on early years for this championship. Some GAA yearbooks give Mohill as the 1904 winner and Manorhamilton Shamrocks as the 1906 winner. There may also have been competitions in 1918–1919 and again in the 1933–1934 period. Contained herein this page ye will find the only results that can be proved conclusively.

Honours
The trophy presented to the winners is the ? The winning club qualifies to represent their county in the Connacht Junior Club Hurling Championship. The winners can, in turn, go on to play in the All-Ireland Junior Club Hurling Championship.

List of finals

Wins listed by club

References

External links
Official Leitrim Website
Leitrim on Hoganstand
Leitrim Club GAA

Senior
 Senior Hurling Championship
Senior hurling county championships